Clinton County Airport  is a former county-owned public-use airport in Clinton County, New York, United States. It served Plattsburgh and the western side of Lake Champlain.

Clinton County transitioned to using the nearby Plattsburgh International Airport as the primary airport for the region on June 18, 2007, and Clinton County Airport is now officially closed to itinerant aircraft, though it is still used for paradrops, and a few aircraft are still based there.

As per Federal Aviation Administration records, the airport had 1,712 passenger boardings (enplanements) in calendar year 2004 and 1,747 enplanements in 2005.  According to the FAA's National Plan of Integrated Airport Systems for 2007–2011, Clinton County was categorized as a general aviation airport because the commercial service category required at least 2,500 passenger boardings per year.

In 1972, a FB-111A Aardvark landed at the airport after the pilot mistook the runway for the airport as being the nearby Plattsburgh Air Force Base.

Facilities and aircraft 
It has two runways; the primary instrument runway is runway 1-19. An instrument landing system is installed on the north-facing runway 1. Runway 1 is also equipped with a medium intensity approach lighting system. A VOR is located on the field and provides a non-precision instrument approach to runway 19. The landing threshold to runway 19 is displaced  for landing due to trees north of the airport. A third, east-west runway, now abandoned, existed during the 1980s.

For the 12-month period ending October 24, 2006, the airport had 14,150 aircraft operations, an average of 38 per day: 78% general aviation and 22% air taxi. At that time there were 30 aircraft based at this airport: 83% single-engine, 13% multi-engine and 3% jet.

References

External links 
 Clinton County Airport at Clinton County website
  airport diagram from New York State DOT
 1946 aerial looking west
 Aerial image as of 7 May 1995 from USGS The National Map

Airports in New York (state)
Transportation buildings and structures in Clinton County, New York
Defunct airports in New York (state)